Dialectica permixtella is a moth of the family Gracillariidae. It is known from the Dominican Republic and Grenada.

References

Dialectica (moth)
Moths described in 1897